Allibone is a surname. Notable people with the surname include:

Jill Allibone (1932–1998), English architectural historian
Samuel Austin Allibone (1816–1889), American author, editor, and bibliographer
Thomas Allibone (1903–2003), English physicist

See also
 Allibond